Harry Lampert (November 3, 1916 – November 13, 2004) was an American cartoonist and bridge teacher and writer.

Biography 
Born in New York City, Lampert began cartooning when he was sixteen years old, and worked for the legendary Max Fleischer, inking and helping produce Betty Boop, Popeye, and Koko the Clown cartoons. While stationed at Drew Field in Tampa, FL, he created Droopy the Drew Field Mosquito which ran in the Drew Field Echoes from 1942-1944. He began drawing comic books and he is best known in that field for being the artistic co-creator of the DC Comics superhero The Flash. Created in collaboration with writer Gardner Fox, the hero first appeared in Flash Comics #1 in 1940, but Lampert left The Flash after drawing only two stories, gravitating towards his preference for humorous work. (After he discovered his fame in the comics world 50 years later, Lampert observed that he did not own any " 'original' originals", not even a Flash comic book. "It was too expensive.") He also drew the comic book characters "The King", "Red, White and Blue" and "The Atom". Lampert later went on to draw gag cartoons for TIME, The New York Times, Esquire, and The Saturday Evening Post. He was also an instructor for the New York City School of Visual Arts and founded the Lampert Agency, an advertising company which produced award-winning ads for clients such as Olympic Airways, Seagram, and the U.S. Virgin Islands.

After his retirement in 1976, Lampert went on to write many instructional books on contract bridge. A Life Master and bridge teacher licensed by the American Contract Bridge League,  Lampert spent years giving classes and working the cruise ship circuit teaching bridge to players. In the mid-1990s, Lampert became active in the comic book convention circuit, selling new sketches and autographs and speaking about his famous comic book creation.

Lampert died on November 13, 2004 in Boca Raton, Florida of complications from prostate cancer; he was survived by wife Adele Lampert, daughter Karen Akavan and two grandsons.

Bridge publications

  Second edition 1980, The Fun Way to Serious Bridge; reprinted 1986, Simon & Schuster Fireside Books. .
 
 
 
 
 

Pamphlets
 "Introduction to Defensive Play" (Devyn, 1989), Future Champions no. 10.

References

External links
 Appearance on San Diego Comicon panel, 2000(video) 
 Biography at Lambiek Comiclopedia
 Droopy the Drew Field Mosquito (scroll down) with gallery at Comics Collection, University of Florida
 

1916 births
2004 deaths
American comics artists
Contract bridge writers
Deaths from prostate cancer
Writers from New York City
Deaths from cancer in Florida
Inkpot Award winners